The Americas Zone  was one of the three zones of regional Davis Cup competition in 2010.  It was divided into four groups.  Teams in Group IV competed for promotion to Group III for 2011.

The Group IV tournament was held in the Week commencing June 29th, 2010 in Panama City, Panama, on outdoor clay courts.

Participating teams

Format
The five teams played in a round-robin format, with each tie consisting of two singles and one doubles match, each best-of-three sets. The top two teams were promoted to the Americas Zone Group III for 2011.

Standings

Barbados and Honduras promoted to Group III for 2011.

Results of Individual Ties

References

External links
Davis Cup draw details

4